Skye Lourie (born 15 December 1990) is a New Zealand-British actress.

Born in New Zealand and raised in Tuscany, Lourie attended Tring Park School for the Performing Arts and Hurtwood House. Skye Lourie is best known for portraying Elizabeth of Weymouth in the TV-miniseries The Pillars of the Earth (2010). Other film credits are The Holding and Guinea Pigs. She guest starred in the TV series Hustle in the episode Curiosity Caught the Kat (2012). In 2011, she featured in the music video Time, written by British drum-and-bass duo Chase & Status' for their second studio album, No More Idols. In 2015, she appeared in Lake Placid vs. Anaconda.

References

External links
 
 Skye Lourie profile at Mandy Actors

Living people
New Zealand actresses
British actresses
1990 births
New Zealand expatriates in Italy
New Zealand emigrants to the United Kingdom